Francisco Hernández García (alias "El 2000", "El Panchillo") is a Mexican drug lord of the Beltrán Leyva Cartel. He was captured on 4 November 2011.  The United States Department of Justice also had charges against Hernández García.

See also
 List of Mexico's 37 most-wanted drug lords

References

Mexican crime bosses
Living people
Year of birth missing (living people)